Wroxeter and Uppington is a civil parish in Shropshire, England.  It contains 44 listed buildings that are recorded in the National Heritage List for England.  Of these, one is listed at Grade I, the highest of the three grades, five are at Grade II*, the middle grade, and the others are at Grade II, the lowest grade.  The parish contains the villages of Wroxeter and Uppington and smaller settlements, and is otherwise rural.  Wroxeter occupies part of the Roman city of Viroconium Cornoviorum, and items of Roman masonry have been incorporated in some of the buildings in the parish, some of which are listed.  Most of the listed buildings in the parish are houses, cottages, farmhouses and farm buildings, many of which are timber framed, and some with cruck construction.  The other listed buildings include churches and associated structures, a public house, a milestone, and two pumps.


Key

Buildings

References

Citations

Sources

Lists of buildings and structures in Shropshire